Sergio Cabrera Cárdenas (born 20 April 1950) is a Colombian film director. He has directed more than twenty films since 1978. He was the subject of Juan Gabriel Vásquez's novel Retrospective. On August 18, 2022, President Gustavo Petro appointed him as Colombia's ambassador to China.

Selected filmography

References

External links 

1950 births
Living people
Colombian film directors
People from Medellín